In Lebanon the first Arabic journal was an annual review, Majmu fawaid li nukhbat afadil which was first published in 1851. The first political, literary, and scientific magazine, the first children's magazine, and the women's magazine in the country were established in the period between 1870 and 1896. These were also the first specialized publications in the Arab world. In 1927 there were 121 magazines in Lebanon. The Lebanese magazines reinforced the improvement and modernization of Arabic literature and liberal thought in the first half of the 20th-century.

As of 2012, there were Arabic language, English language and French language magazines in the country. In 2015 there were 192 political magazines in Lebanon which were 16% of the magazines published the Middle East and North Africa. There are also editions of international magazines, including Marie Claire, in Lebanon.

The following is an incomplete list of current and defunct magazines published in Lebanon.

A

 Abaad
 Achabaka
 Al Adab
 Al Adib
 Al Arab
 Assayad
 At-Tabib

B

 Al Bashir
 Al Bayan
 Al Bia wal Tanmia

C
 Le Commerce du Levant

E
 Executive

H

 Al-Hadaf
 Al Hadatha
 Hask
 Al Hasnaa
 Al Hawadeth
 Al Hiwar

I
  Al Iktissad Wal Aamal
 Al-Irfan (magazine)

J
 Al Jaras
 Jasad
Al Jinan

L
 Lebanon Opportunities
 Lotus

M

 Al-Machriq
 Magazine le mensuel
 Al Marad
 Massis
 Al Mawed
 Al Mughtareb
 Al Muqtataf

N

 Nadine
 Al Nahla
 Nayiri
 An-Nibras

P
 Pakin
 Prestige

R
 Real
 La Revue Phénicienne

S

 Sawt al-Mahrumin
 Shi'r
 Ash-Shiraa
 Shirak
 Snob
 Sowar

T
 Al Tariq
 Today's Outlook

See also
 List of newspapers in Lebanon

References

Lebanon
Magazines